Markus Brüderlin (Basel, 15 May 1958 – Frankfurt am Main, Germany, 16 March 2014) was a Swiss art historian, curator and writer.

Brüderlin studied history of art and philosophy in Vienna. In 1996 he was appointed curator at the Fondation Beyeler in Basel. In 2006 he became director of the Kunstmuseum Wolfsburg.

Brüderlin died unexpectedly on 16 March 2014 at his home in Frankfurt, Hesse, Germany. He was 55 years old.

References

Other websites
 Markus Brüderlin at the Kunstmuseum Wolfsburg website 

1958 births
2014 deaths
Swiss art historians
People from Basel-Stadt
Swiss non-fiction writers
Swiss male writers
Swiss curators
Male non-fiction writers